Eugenia guayaquilensis is a species of plant in the family Myrtaceae. It is endemic to Ecuador.

References

Endemic flora of Ecuador
guayaquilensis
Critically endangered plants
Taxonomy articles created by Polbot